Whatever You Say (original title: Mon idole) is a 2002 French comedy-drama film directed by Guillaume Canet and starring François Berléand, Guillaume Canet, Diane Kruger, Daniel Prévost, and Clotilde Courau.

Plot
Philippe Letzger (Philippe Lefebvre) is the host of It's Tissue Time!, an exploitation television game show where contestants are made to cry. The show's audiences are warmed up by one of Letzger's assistants, Bastien (Guillaume Canet), an ambitious young man who provides Letzger with good ideas for the show, for which his boss eagerly takes credit. Bastien tolerates Letzger's antics in order to work with Jean-Louis Broustal (François Berléand), the show's sophisticated producer whom he admires. Bastien's girlfriend, Fabienne (Clotilde Courau), is frustrated by his worship of the suave producer. Bastien is equally frustrated when he finds out that the blonde he is attracted to at the office is in fact Broustal's young wife, Clara (Diane Kruger).

One day, Broustal begins to take interest in Bastien's ideas for the show, and invites him to spend the weekend with him and his wife at their country estate to work on a concept for a new show called Proof in Pictures. When they arrive, Clara quickly seduces Bastien, but Broustal does not seem to care. During the weekend, Broustal tells the young man that he can make him a television star, but the couple's motives seem strange, and possibly sinister.

Cast
 François Berléand as Jean-Louis Broustal 
 Guillaume Canet as Bastien
 Diane Kruger as Clara Broustal
 Philippe Lefebvre as Philippe Letzger
 Daniel Prévost as M. Balbot 
 Clotilde Courau as Fabienne
 Jacqueline Jehanneuf as Maryvonne 
 Andrée Damant as Micheline
 Gilles Lellouche as Daniel Bénard
 Jean-Paul Rouve as Patrick
 Anne Marivin as The assistant
 Laurent Lafitte as Fabrice
 Pierre Jolivet as Bertrand Vigneau

Accolades

References

External links
 
 

2002 films
2000s French-language films
Films directed by Guillaume Canet
French comedy-drama films
Films about television
2002 directorial debut films
2000s French films
2002 comedy-drama films